The 1963 Ontario general election was held on September 25, 1963, to elect the 108 members of the 27th Legislative Assembly of Ontario (Members of Provincial Parliament, or "MPPs") of the Province of Ontario.

The Ontario Progressive Conservative Party, led by John Robarts, who had replaced Leslie Frost as PC leader and premier in 1961, won a seventh consecutive term in office, and maintained its majority in the legislature, increasing its caucus from the 71 members elected in the previous election to 77 members in an enlarged legislature.

The Ontario Liberal Party, led by John Wintermeyer, increased its caucus from 22 to 24 members, although Wintermeyer lost his seat of Waterloo North. He resigned as party leader but the Liberals continued in their role of official opposition. Robert Gibson of Kenora was re-elected as a Liberal-Labour MPP sitting with the Liberal caucus.

The social democratic Co-operative Commonwealth Federation was formally dissolved and succeeded by the Ontario New Democratic Party in 1961. The newly conglomerated party was still led by Donald C. MacDonald, and won two additional seats, for a total of seven.

Expansion of Legislative Assembly
The size of the Legislative Assembly was increased from 98 to 108 members, through the reorganization of Toronto's suburban ridings:

Results

|-
! colspan=2 rowspan=2 | Political party
! rowspan=2 | Party leader
! colspan=5 | MPPs
! colspan=3 | Votes
|-
! Candidates
!1959
!Dissol.
!1963
!±
!#
!%
! ± (pp)

|style="text-align:left;"|John Robarts
|108
|71
|
|77
|6
|1,052,740
|48.61%
|2.46

|style="text-align:left;"|John Wintermeyer
|107
|21
|
|23
|2
|754,032
|34.82%
|1.44

|style="text-align:left;"|Donald C. MacDonald
|97
|5
|
|7
|2
|340,208
|15.71%
|0.96

|style="text-align:left;"|
|1
|1
|
|1
|
|6,774
|0.31%
|0.04

|style="text-align:left;"|
|1
|–
|–
|–
|
|5,190
|0.24%
|0.13

|style="text-align:left;"|
|7
|–
|–
|–
|
|2,759
|0.13%
|0.09

|style="text-align:left;"|
|9
|–
|–
|–
|
|2,313
|0.11%
|0.02

|style="text-align:left;"|
|6
|–
|–
|–
|
|1,654
|0.08%
|0.15

|style="text-align:left;"|Socialist-Labour
|style="text-align:left;"|
|1
|–
|–
|–
|
|103
|–
|

|style="text-align:left;"|
|
|–
|–
|–
|
|colspan="3"|did not campaign

|style="text-align:left;"|
|
|–
|–
|–
|
|colspan="3"|did not campaign

|colspan="3"|
|
|colspan="5"|
|-style="background:#E9E9E9;"
|colspan="3" style="text-align:left;"|Total
|337
|98
|98
|108
|
|2,165,773
|100.00%
|
|-
|colspan="8" style="text-align:left;"|Blank and invalid ballots
|align="right"|18,028
|style="background:#E9E9E9;" colspan="2"|
|-style="background:#E9E9E9;"
|colspan="8" style="text-align:left;"|Registered voters / turnout
|3,435,745
|59.72%
|3.84
|}

Reorganization of ridings
The reorganized ridings returned the following MPPs:

Seats that changed hands

There were 12 seats that changed allegiance in the election.

 PC to Liberal
Algoma—Manitoulin
Essex South
Grey North
Huron—Bruce
Ottawa East
Timiskaming

 Liberal to PC
Oxford
Stormont
Waterloo North
Wentworth

 Liberal to NDP
Fort William

 NDP to PC
Oshawa

See also
Politics of Ontario
List of Ontario political parties
Premier of Ontario
Leader of the Opposition (Ontario)

References

Further reading
 

1963 elections in Canada
1963
1963 in Ontario
September 1963 events in Canada